Springett Penn  (25 January 1675 – 10 April 1696) was the second son of William Penn, founder of Pennsylvania, and his first wife Gulielma Maria Springett Penn, and the first of their children to survive infancy.

1674 births
1696 deaths
English Quakers
Springett
English people of Welsh descent